Fritz Zwicky (February 14, 1898 – February 8, 1974) was a Swiss astronomer. He worked most of his life at the California Institute of Technology in the United States of America, where he made many important contributions in theoretical and observational astronomy. In 1933, Zwicky was the first to use the virial theorem to postulate the existence of unseen dark matter, describing it as "".

Biography 

Fritz Zwicky was born in Varna, Bulgaria, to a Swiss father (citizenship in Mollis, Glarus) and Czech mother. His father, Fridolin (b. 1868), was a prominent industrialist in the Bulgarian city and also served as ambassador of Norway in Varna (1908–1933). The father Fridolin designed and built his family's Zwicky House in Varna. Fritz's mother, Franziska Vrček (b. 1871), was an ethnic Czech of the Austro-Hungarian Empire. Fritz was the oldest of the Zwicky family's three children: he had a younger brother named Rudolf and a sister, Leonie. Fritz's mother died in Varna in 1927. His father Fridolin lived and worked in Bulgaria until 1945, after World War II, when he returned to Switzerland. Fritz's sister Leonie married a Bulgarian from Varna and spent her entire life in the city.

In 1904, at the age of six, Fritz was sent to his paternal grandparents in the family's ancestral canton of Glarus, Switzerland, to study commerce. His interests shifted to math and physics. He received an advanced education in mathematics and experimental physics at the Swiss Federal Polytechnic (today known as ETH Zurich) in Zurich. There, he finished his studies in 1922 with a Dr. sc. nat. degree (PhD equivalent) with a thesis entitled Zur Theorie der heteropolaren Kristalle.  

In 1925, Zwicky emigrated to the United States to work with Robert Millikan at California Institute of Technology (Caltech) after receiving the "international fellowship from the Rockefeller Foundation". He had an office down the hall from Robert Oppenheimer.

German colleague Walter Baade claims to have been accused by Zwicky of being a Nazi, and falsely staged complaints that he "feared" Zwicky. Unknown to the public was that Baade was fearful, because he had named a galaxy after himself that was discovered by Zwicky. Edwin Hubble corrected this injustice and the galaxy was catalogued as a Zwicky galaxy. 

Zwicky developed numerous cosmological theories that have had a profound influence on the understanding of our universe in the early 21st century. He coined the term "supernova" while fostering the concept of neutron stars. Five years passed before Oppenheimer published his landmark paper announcing "neutron stars". 

Zwicky was appointed Professor of Astronomy at Caltech in 1942. He also worked as a research director/consultant for Aerojet Engineering Corporation (1943–1961), and as a staff member of Mount Wilson Observatory and Palomar Observatory for most of his career. He developed some of the earliest jet engines and holds more than 50 patents, many in jet propulsion. He invented the Underwater Jet.

Personal life
In April 1932, Fritz Zwicky married Dorothy Vernon Gates (1904-1991), a member of a prominent local family and a daughter of California State Senator Egbert Gates. Her money was instrumental in the funding of the Palomar Observatory during the Great Depression. Nicholas Roosevelt, cousin of President Theodore Roosevelt, was his brother-in-law by marriage to Tirzah Gates. Zwicky and Dorothy divorced amicably in 1941. 

In 1947 Zwicky married in Switzerland to Anna Margaritha Zürcher. They had three daughters together, Margrit, Franziska, and Barbarina. The Zwicky Museum at the Landesbibliothek, Glarus, houses many of his papers and scientific works. Zwicky died in Pasadena, California on February 8, 1974, and was buried in Mollis, Switzerland.

Zwicky was an atheist. 

"The universe is so unique and perfect that it could not have originated by chance, but was designed by flawless, creative design." Fritz Zwicky to Barbarina Zwicky who also gifted his youngest daughter a King James Version Bible in 1962 for Christmas.

He is remembered as both a genius and a curmudgeon. One of his favorite insults was to refer to people whom he did not like as "spherical bastards", because, as he explained, they were bastards no matter which way one looked at them.

Legacy
The Fritz Zwicky Stiftung (Foundation) was established in Switzerland to carry on his ideas relating to "Morphological analysis". The foundation published a biography of Zwicky in English: Alfred Stöckli & Roland Müller: Fritz Zwicky – An Extraordinary Astrophysicist. Cambridge: Cambridge Scientific Publishers, 2011. A review of the book is available from Acta Morphologica Generalis .

Scientific work 

Fritz Zwicky was a prolific scientist and made important contributions in many areas of astronomy.

Ionic crystals and electrolytes
His first scientific contributions pertained to ionic crystals and electrolytes.

Supernovae and neutron stars 
Together with colleague Walter Baade, Zwicky pioneered and promoted the use of the first Schmidt telescopes used in a mountain-top observatory in 1935. In 1934 he and Baade coined the term "supernova" and hypothesized that supernovae were the transition of normal stars into neutron stars, as well as the origin of cosmic rays. This was an opinion which contributed to determining the size and age of the universe subsequently.

In support of this hypothesis, Zwicky started looking for supernovae, and found a total of 120 by himself (and one more, SN 1963J, in concert with Paul Wild) over 52 years (SN 1921B through SN 1973K), a record which stood until 2009 when passed by Tom Boles. Zwicky did his laborious work, comparing photographic plates with the human eye, which is far more challenging and difficult than Boles accomplished using modern technology for his record.

Gravitational lenses 
In 1937, Zwicky posited that galaxies could act as gravitational lenses by the previously discovered Einstein effect. It was not until 1979 that this effect was confirmed by observation of the so-called "Twin Quasar" Q0957+561.

Dark matter 
While examining the Coma galaxy cluster in 1933, Zwicky was the first to use the virial theorem to discover the existence of a gravitational anomaly, which he termed dunkle Materie 'dark matter'. The gravitational anomaly surfaced due to the excessive rotational velocity of luminous matter compared to the calculated gravitational attraction within the cluster. He calculated the gravitational mass of the galaxies within the cluster from the observed rotational velocities and obtained a value at least 400 times greater than expected from their luminosity. The same calculation today shows a smaller factor, based on greater values for the mass of luminous material.

Tired light 

When Edwin Hubble discovered a somewhat linear relationship between the distance to a galaxy and its redshift expressed as a velocity, Zwicky immediately pointed out that the correlation between the calculated distances of galaxies and their redshifts had a discrepancy too large to fit in the distance's error margins. He proposed that the reddening effect was not due to motions of the galaxy, but to an unknown phenomenon that caused photons to lose energy as they traveled through space. He considered the most likely candidate process to be a drag effect in which photons transfer momentum to surrounding masses through gravitational interactions; and proposed that an attempt be made to put this effect on a sound theoretical footing with general relativity. He also considered and rejected explanations involving interactions with free electrons, or the expansion of space.

Zwicky was skeptical of the expansion of space in 1929, because the rates measured at that time seemed too large. It was not until 1956 that Walter Baade corrected the distance scale based on Cepheid variable stars, and ushered in the first accurate measures of the expansion rate. Cosmological redshift is now conventionally understood to be a consequence of the expansion of space; a feature of Big Bang cosmology.

Morphological analysis 
Zwicky developed a generalised form of morphological analysis, which is a method for systematically structuring and investigating the total set of relationships contained in multi-dimensional, usually non-quantifiable, problem complexes. He wrote a book on the subject in 1969, and claimed that he made many of his discoveries using this method.

Catalog of Galaxies and Clusters 

Zwicky devoted considerable time to the search for galaxies and the production of catalogs. From 1961 to 1968 he and his colleagues published a comprehensive six volume Catalogue of galaxies and of clusters of galaxies. They were all published in Pasadena, by the California Institute of Technology.

Galaxies in the original catalog are called Zwicky galaxies, and the catalog is still maintained and updated today. Zwicky with his wife Margaritha also produced an important catalog of compact galaxies, sometimes called simply The Red Book.

Original thinker 
Zwicky was an original thinker, and his contemporaries frequently had no way of knowing which of his ideas would work out and which would not. In a retrospective look at Zwicky's life and work, Stephen Maurer said:
When researchers talk about neutron stars, dark matter, and gravitational lenses, they all start the same way: "Zwicky noticed this problem in the 1930s. Back then, nobody listened..."

He is celebrated for the discovery of neutron stars. He also proposed a concept he called nuclear goblins, which he described as "a body of nuclear density ... only stable under sufficient external pressure within a massive and dense star". He considered that these goblins could move within a star, and explode violently as they reach less dense regions towards the star's surface, and serve to explain eruptive phenomena, such as flare stars. This idea has never caught on.

An anecdote often told of Zwicky concerns an informal experiment to see if he could reduce problems with turbulence hindering an observation session one night at Mount Wilson observatory. He told his assistant to fire a gun out through the telescope slit, in the hope it would help smooth out the turbulence. No effect was noticed, but the event shows the kind of lateral thinking for which Zwicky was famous.

In a talk to a Caltech PhD student Frank Malina, who experienced some difficulties working on a dissertation regarding characteristics of oxygen-gasoline rocket engine, Fritz Zwicky claimed the engineer "must realize that a rocket could not operate in space as it required the atmosphere to push against to provide thrust". Zwicky later admitted that he had been mistaken.

He was also very proud of his work in producing the first artificial meteors. He placed explosive charges in the nose cone of a V2 rocket, to be detonated at high altitude and fire high velocity pellets of metal through the atmosphere. The first attempts appeared to be failures, and Zwicky sought to try again with the Aerobee rocket. His requests were denied, until the Soviet Union launched Sputnik 1. Twelve days later, on October 16, 1957, Zwicky launched his experiment on the Aerobee, and successfully fired pellets visible from the Mount Palomar observatory. It is thought that one of these pellets may have escaped the gravitational pull of the Earth and become the first object launched into a solar orbit.

Zwicky also considered the possibility of rearranging the universe to our own liking. In a lecture in 1948 he spoke of changing planets, or relocating them within the solar system. In the 1960s he even considered how the whole solar system might be moved like a giant spaceship to travel to other stars. He considered this might be achieved by firing pellets into the Sun to produce asymmetrical fusion explosions, and by this means he thought that the star Alpha Centauri might be reached within 2500 years.

Humanitarian 
Zwicky was a generous humanitarian with a great concern for wider society. These two sides of his nature came together in the aftermath of the Second World War, when Zwicky worked hard to collect tons of books on astronomy and other topics, and shipped them to war-ravaged scientific libraries in Europe and Asia.

He also had a longstanding involvement with the charitable Pestalozzi Foundation of America, supporting orphanages. Zwicky received their gold medal in 1955, in recognition of his services.

Zwicky loved the mountains, and was an accomplished alpine climber.

He was critical of political posturing by all sides in the Middle East, and of the use of nuclear weapons in World War II. He considered that hope for the world lay with free people of good will who work together as needed, without institutions or permanent organizations.

Media persona
Zwicky's ideas captured the imagination of the public. He was widely quoted by reporters.

In January 1934 the Los Angeles Times published the cartoon "Be Scientific with Ol' Doc Dabble", which had a caption describing Zwicky's research and which implicitly caricatured him as "Doc Dabble".

Honors 
In 1949, Truman awarded Zwicky the Medal of Freedom, for work on rocket propulsion during World War II. In 1968, Zwicky was made professor emeritus at California Institute of Technology.
In 1972, Zwicky was awarded the Gold Medal of the Royal Astronomical Society, their most prestigious award, for "distinguished contributions to astronomy and cosmology". This award noted in particular his work on neutron stars, dark matter, and cataloging of galaxies.
The asteroid 1803 Zwicky and the lunar crater Zwicky are both named in his honor.
The Zwicky Transient Facility is named in his honor.

Publications 
Zwicky produced hundreds of publications over a long career, covering a great breadth of topics. This brief selection, with comments, gives a taste of his work.
 . This is the article that proposes a tired light model to explain Hubble's law. (full article)
These consecutive articles introduce the notion of a supernova and a neutron star respectively.
 . The idea of a neutron star, previously introduced in the supernova paper, is explained along with the idea of critical stellar mass and black holes.
 . Zwicky argues that the shape of nebulae indicate a universe far older than can be accounted for by an expanding universe model.
 . Zwicky was a great advocate for the use of the wide angle Schmidt telescope, which he used to great effect to make many discoveries.
. Zwicky did work on jet propulsion and other matters with Aerojet corporation during and after the war.
. In this book Zwicky gives free rein to his ideas on morphological research as a tool for making discoveries in astronomy.
 . As well as proposing neutron stars, Zwicky also proposed unstable aggregations of neutron density matter within larger stars.

. Zwicky also proposed that the morphological approach could be applied to all kinds of issues in disciplines going far beyond basic science.

References

Sources 
 Johnson Jr., John (2019). Zwicky: Going Supernova, Harvard. Description & arrow-searchable preview.  Book review at Marcia Bartusiak  "'Zwicky' Review: Going Supernova," Wall Street Journal. September 13, 2019 (Sept. 14–15, 2019, p. C9 in print ed.), retrieved 2019-09-14.

Further reading
 Freeman Dyson, "The Power of Morphological Thinking" (review of John Johnson Jr., Zwicky: The Outcast Genius Who Unmasked the Universe, Harvard University Press, 2019, 352 pp.), The New York Review of Books, vol. LXVII, no. 1 (January 16, 2020), pp. 42, 44. Freeman Dyson writes (p. 42): "The change [around 1935] from a peaceful to a violent view of the universe was the result of many discoveries by many scientists using a variety of instruments, but one man and one instrument made a major contribution to it. The man was Fritz Zwicky... The instrument was a little eighteen-inch telescope that he installed near the summit of Mount Palomar in California in 1935... Zwicky's small, cheap telescope was the second one built with a revolutionary design by Bernhard Schmidt... in Germany.... The Schmidt telescope had an enormous advantage over other telescopes at that time: it focused light accurately over a wide field of view...."
 Winkler, Kurt, "Fritz Zwicky and the Search for Dark Matter," Swiss American Historical Society Review, vol. 50, no. 2 (2014), p. 23-41.

External links 

 
 
 
 Fritz Zwicky foundation (in German)
 Proc Natl Acad Sci
 Initial Evidence of Dark Matter — Annenberg Learner 
 

1898 births
1974 deaths
People from Varna, Bulgaria
20th-century Swiss astronomers
Swiss cosmologists
American cosmologists
Swiss atheists
Swiss people of Czech descent
Swiss emigrants to the United States
California Institute of Technology faculty
Recipients of the Gold Medal of the Royal Astronomical Society
Recipients of the Medal of Freedom
ETH Zurich alumni
Swiss expatriates in Bulgaria

Fellows of the American Physical Society